The Nakajima B3N was a prototype Japanese carrier-based torpedo-bomber aircraft of the 1930s.  A single-engined biplane with a crew of three, it was unsuccessful, only two being built.

Development and design
In April 1932, the Imperial Japanese Navy placed orders with Mitsubishi and Nakajima for prototypes of three-seat torpedo-bombers to replace the relatively unsuccessful Mitsubishi B2M and the earlier Mitsubishi B1M aboard Japan's aircraft carriers.  Nakajima's design was a single-engined biplane with a slender circular section fuselage of steel tube construction. It had single-bay metal and fabric wings, with both the upper and lower wings gulled to meet the fuselage, with the upper wings gulled normally and the lower wings in an inverted gull arrangement, forming an X shape. It had a tailwheel undercarriage, with the main wheels attached to the lower wing where the gulled section joined the main wing. The new 700 hp (522 kW) Nakajima Hikari engine was chosen to power the aircraft, driving a three-bladed fixed-pitch metal propeller.

Nakajima built two prototypes in 1933, with the internal designation Nakajima Y3B, as the Experimental 7-Shi Carrier Attack Aircraft, with the short designation B3N1 but the prototype Hikari engines proved unreliable, and the type was not accepted by the Navy. Mitsubishi's competing 7-Shi design, the Rolls-Royce Buzzard powered 3MT10 was also a failure, the sole prototype crashing on take-off in 1934, with the design from the Navy's own Air Technical Arsenal at Yokosuka, which was started later than the competing designs from Mitsubishi and Nakajima and therefore managed to avoid some of their flaws, being ordered into production as the Yokosuka B3Y.

Specifications (B3N1)

See also

References

Mikesh, Robert C. and Abe, Shorzoe. Japanese Aircraft 1910-1941. London:Putnam, 1990. .

External links

 

Carrier-based aircraft
B3N
B3N
Biplanes
Single-engined tractor aircraft
Aircraft first flown in 1933